"Spark" is a song recorded by South Korean singer Taeyeon for her second studio album Purpose. It was released on October 28, 2019, as the album's lead single by SM Entertainment on October 28, 2019. The song was written by Kenzie, and composed by Kenzie, Anne Judith Wik and Ronny Svendsen. It was described as an alternative soul pop song incorporating intense melody with emotions and Taeyeon's overwhelming vocals and the lyrics contains various metaphors that expresses her identity.

The song debuted at number two on the Gaon Digital Chart. The song additionally charted at number 25 on the Billboard World Digital Songs and debuted at number two on Billboard K-pop Hot 100.

Background 
On October 10, 2019, Taeyeon's agency SM Entertainment announced that her second full-length studio album would be released in the end of October. The album's title is Purpose, while the lead single was announced to be "Spark", which was released simultaneously with the release of the album.

Reception 

Lim Dong-yeob and Hwang Seon-up from IZM praised Taeyeon's vocals on the song and compared its musical styles to those of English singer Adele in "Rolling in the Deep", American band OneRepublic in "Counting Stars" and Scottish singer Emeli Sandé in "Hurts".

"Spark" debuted at number two on the Gaon Digital Chart for the week ending November 7, 2019. Within its first week of release, the single sold 47,032,838 digital index points through South Korean digital music services. It peaked at number one on the Gaon Download Chart. The song additionally debuted at number 25 on the Billboard World Digital Songs and debuted at number two on Billboard K-pop Hot 100.

Charts

Weekly charts

Monthly charts

Year-end charts

Sales

Awards and nominations

Music program awards

Personnel 
Credits are adapted from the CD booklet of Purpose.

 Original title: H(EX)
 Korean lyrics by Kenzie
 Composed by Kenzie, Anne Judith Wik, Ronny Svendsen
 Arranged by Kenzie, Anne Judith Wik, Ronny Svendsen
 Background vocals by Taeyeon, Kenzie
 Digital Editing by Lee Min-gyu at SM Big Shot Studio
 Engineered for Mix by Lee Min-gyu at SM Big Shot Studio
 Recorded by Jeong Eui-seok at SM Blue Cup Studio
 Mixed by Nam Gung-jin at SM Concert Hall Studio
 Mastered by Dave Kutch at The Mastering Palace

See also
 List of Inkigayo Chart winners (2019)
 List of Music Bank Chart winners (2019)
 List of Show! Music Core Chart winners (2019)

References 

2019 songs
2019 singles
SM Entertainment singles
Korean-language songs
Taeyeon songs
Songs written by Kenzie (songwriter)
Soul songs